Diego Antonio de Elizondo Prado (born 5 March 1779–5 October 1852) was a Chilean bishop and politician who served as President of the Senate of Chile.

External links
 BCN Profile

1817 births
1867 deaths
Chilean people
Chilean politicians
Chilean bishops
Conservative Party (Chile) politicians
Presidents of the Senate of Chile